Papaipema arctivorens, the northern burdock borer,  is a species of moth of the family Noctuidae. It is found from Quebec to northern Georgia, west to Missouri and north to Minnesota and Ontario.

The wingspan is 27–39 mm. The forewings are light orange with rusty red shading and speckling. The hindwings are pale brown with a darker discal lunule and subterminal band. Adults are on wing from August to October in one generation per year.

The larvae feed on Arctium, Cirsium, Dipsacus, and sometimes Verbena and Verbascum species. They bore in the rhizomes of their host plant.

References

Moths described in 1910
arctivorens
Moths of North America